Michael's First Album is the first solo album by Malaysian singer Michael Wong, released on 20 May 2001.

Track list
 Intro
 單戀 (dān liàn)
 第一次 (dì yī cì)
 Stop Now
 我愛你.在哪裡 (wǒ ài nǐ · zài nǎ lǐ)
 如果你還愛我 (rú guǒ nǐ hái ài wǒ)
 朋友首日封 (péng yǒu shǒu rì fēng)
 回到一個人 (huí dào yī gè rén)
 電梯 (diàn tī)
 我想去個地方 (wǒ xiǎng qù gè dì fāng)
 你好嗎 (nǐ hǎo ma)
 Ending

Michael Wong (singer) albums
2001 albums
Mandopop albums